Meillonnas is a commune in the Ain department in eastern France.

Geography
The Sevron has its source in the commune; it crosses the village and forms part of the commune's northern border.

The bief du Bois Tharlet, a tributary of the Sevron, forms most of the commune's western border.

Population

See also
Communes of the Ain department

References

External links

Communes of Ain
Ain communes articles needing translation from French Wikipedia